Mettupalayam Road, (NH 181) is a major arterial road in city of Coimbatore, Tamil Nadu, India. This NH runs for about 10 kilometers starting exactly from Rangai Gownder street up to the northern Thudiyalur within the corporation limits.Beyond that the road continues northwards for a distance of 26 kilometres till Mettupalayam. The road narrows at the stretches between Edayar street, RG street and Flower Market areas. Green Corridor system is under implementation between Chintamani and Thudiyalur to synchronise traffic signals, as it is one of the most congested stretches in the city. This road connects the city with Saibaba Colony Bus Terminus  and the northern suburbs in the Coimbatore Metropolitan Area.

Features and alignment
The National Highways Authority of India(NHAI) has proposed bypass road from Neelambur on NH47 and will join Mettupalayam Road at Narasimhanaickenpalayam. This would help ease the traffic on the road. It is one of the widely used stretches in the city, with a large number of tourists using the road to reach the tourism destination of Ooty.

North Coimbatore Flyover
The flyover was opened in 1992 to reduce traffic congestion by a railway line connecting Coimbatore Junction and Coimbatore North Junction

Goundampalayam Flyover
Currently a four lane Flyover is under construction by bypassing to reduce traffic congestion at Goundampalayam and GN Mills junctions on the Mettupalayam Road.

Railway stations along Mettupalayam Road
 Thudiyalur railway station
 Coimbatore North Junction railway station

Places transversed
 RG Street
 City market(Poo market)
 Chintamani circle
 Sai Baba colony
 Goundampalayam
  GN Mills
 Thudiyalur

Cinemas
 TheCinema@Brookefields - 06 Screens
 Baba Cinemas - 02 Screens
 Central Theatre - 02 Screens
 SDC Cinemas-Kalpana A/C 4K Dolby Atmos, Koundampalayam
 Sri Murugan Cinema A/C 4K Dolby Atmos, Thudiyalur

References

Roads in Coimbatore